The Columbia Stingers were a team in the National Indoor Football League (NIFL) which played for one season, in 2007.  The team played their home games at the Colonial Center, home to South Carolina Gamecocks basketball.

The Coach for the Columbia Stingers in 2007 was Corey Miller, who played football for both the University of South Carolina and the New York Giants.

Their Offensive Coordinator 2007 was Stephan Darby; Assistant Coach was Stacey Anderson; Specialty Coach was John Gill; Secondary/Strength Coach was Danny Samuel; Quarterbacks coach was Kent Merideth; and Speed coach was Anthony Washington.

The team is now defunct.  It remains to be seen as to whether there will be any other attempts to bring an Arena Football team to Columbia.

Season-by-season 

|-
|2007 || 1 || 7 || 0 || 4th Atlantic || --

External links
Press release announcing the team
 Newspaper press release
fansite

National Indoor Football League teams
Sports in Columbia, South Carolina
American football teams in South Carolina
American football teams established in 2006
American football teams disestablished in 2007
2006 establishments in South Carolina
2007 disestablishments in South Carolina